Phara Souffrant Forrest (born February 5, 1989) is an American politician, nurse, and tenant activist. A member of the Democratic Socialists of America, Forrest is the assembly member for the 57th district of the New York State Assembly. After narrowly defeating incumbent Assembly Member Walter T. Mosley in the Democratic primary in June 2020, Forrest won the general election in November of that year. Forrest defeated former District Manager of Community Board 2 Olanike Alabi in the primary to defend her seat in 2022. She was unopposed in the general election.

Early life and education
Forrest was born in Crown Heights, Brooklyn to immigrants from Haiti. In 2011, she graduated from State University of New York at Geneseo with a B.A. in International Relations and Affairs. Forrest pursued a career in nursing, attending the New York City College of Technology and the CUNY School of Professional Studies to receive an A.A.S. and B.S. in Registered Nursing, respectively.

Political career 
In 2017, Forrest joined the Crown Heights Tenant Union as part of her efforts to fight against the gentrification and displacement of her rent-stabilized apartment building. Then in June 2019 she worked with the Housing Justice for All campaign to fortify tenant protective rights.

In August 2019, Forrest launched a campaign against incumbent Democrat Walter T. Mosley in the primary for the heavily Democratic 57th State Assembly district. Souffrant's campaign emphasized support for decarceration, investment in public housing, and state-wide single-payer healthcare. During her campaign, she was endorsed by the Democratic Socialists of America and Representative Alexandria Ocasio-Cortez. Her campaign was funded entirely by the community, with no outside funding from corporations or businesses.

Forrest trailed Mosley by 588 votes on election night June 23, 2020, but absentee ballots were more significant than usual due to the COVID-19 pandemic. Once absentee ballots were counted on July 22, 2020, Forrest led Mosley by over 2,500 votes and was declared the winner. While Mosley remained on the general election ballot under the Working Families Party line, Forrest won the November race with about 74% of the vote over Mosley's 26%.

In 2022, Forrest was challenged by former District Leader and Community Board District Manager Olanike "Ola" Alabi in the Democratic Primary. Alabi was supported by the Kings County Democratic Party and Congressman Hakeem Jeffries, among others. Forrest won with 67.24% of the vote while Alabi received 32.43% of the vote. Forrest was uncontested in the General Election.

References

Living people
Democratic Socialists of America politicians from New York
Democratic Party members of the New York State Assembly
New York (state) socialists
Politicians from Brooklyn
American politicians of Haitian descent
Women state legislators in New York (state)
21st-century American politicians
21st-century American women politicians
City University of New York alumni
State University of New York at Geneseo alumni
1989 births